Minny Evaline Mock-Degen (4 May 1945, Vevey – 11 April 2020, Israel) was a Dutch anthropologist, writer, and publisher, best remembered for her publication Rijkdom : Joodse naoorlogse verhalen (2018), her activism for Dutch Jews, for translating Israeli books into Dutch, and printing Jewish literature.

References 

1945 births
2020 deaths
Dutch anthropologists
Dutch writers
Dutch Jews
Publishers (people)
People from Vevey